The 1999 Tokyo gubernatorial election were held on April 11, 1999 as part of the 14th unified local elections. Incumbent Yukio Aoshima announced that he would not seek re-election. All major candidates ran as independents but several were supported by major parties. The Liberal Democratic Party, led by Secretary General Yoshiro Mori, supported Yasushi Akashi as a compromise with coalition partner New Komeito, but local LDP legislators divided their support between candidates Ishihara, Masuzoe and Kakizawa.

Author and former Diet member Shintaro Ishihara, who had previously come in second in the 1975 gubernatorial election against incumbent governor Ryokichi Minobe,  won the election on a nationalist platform, saying that he would have the United States return Yokota Air Base to Japan and clarify its position on Japan's ownership of the Senkaku Islands. Akashi came in fourth, the poorest showing by an LDP-supported candidate in Tokyo history.

Results 

 
 
 
 
 
 
 
 
 
Note: Excludes twelve other candidates, none of whom received more than 0.3% of total votes.

References

1999 elections in Japan
Shintaro Ishihara
Tokyo gubernatorial elections
April 1999 events in Asia
1999 in Tokyo